Emily Loizeau (born 7 February 1975) is a French author, composer, and singer. Her debut album, released in 2006, was titled L'autre bout du monde (The Other Side of the World).

Biography 
Loizeau was born in Neuilly-sur-Seine, near Paris, France. Her father, Pierre Loizeau, was French, and her mother, Eliza Hutchinson, was British. Her maternal grandparents were actress Peggy Ashcroft and barrister Jeremy Hutchinson.

Around 1980, when she was five years old, Loizeau began to learn piano. After studying classical music for many years, she turned to studying philosophy and then theatre in London, then worked assisting composer and stage manager Georges Aperghis.

Loizeau cites Georges Brassens, Bob Dylan and The Beatles as her primary influences. Besides Bach and Franz Schubert, she also loves Renaud. She has also been influenced by Tom Waits, Nina Simone and Randy Newman.

At the end of 2001, at the age of 26, Loizeau began to perform at a small Parisian cabaret, which became for her a one-person cottage industry, printing flyers, doing publicity. She then began to collaborate with like-minded artists such as Vincent Segal, Franck Monnet, Nils Tavernier, Jean-Louis Foulquier. She later performed at the Comedia, where she sold out for three weeks straight.

Discography 
Folie en tête (2005)
L'autre bout du monde (2006)
Live au Grand Rex (2007)
King Guillaume (2009)
Pays sauvage (2009)
Mothers & Tygers (2012)
Revisited: Piano Cello Sessions (2014) - with Olivier Koundouno on violincello
Mona (2016)
Origami (2017)
Run Run Run (Hommage à Lou Reed) (2020)
Icare (2021)

References

External links 

 Emily's Official site

1975 births
Living people
French people of English descent
Fiction Records artists
21st-century French singers
21st-century French women singers